Aboaso is a town in the Ashanti Region of Ghana, located about  northeast of Kumasi. The town is known for the Gyeama Penson Secondary Technical School.  The school is a second cycle institution.

References

Populated places in the Ashanti Region